Dil Maya Rai is a Bhutanese politician who has been a member of the National Assembly of Bhutan, since October 2018.

Education
She holds a Master's degree in Development Management from Asian Institute of Management and a Bachelor of Sociology degree from the University of the Philippines Los Baños.

Political career
Prior to entering politics, she was a social development specialist.

She was elected to the National Assembly of Bhutan as a candidate of DNT from Tashichhoeling constituency in 2018 Bhutanese National Assembly election. She received 6,032 votes and defeated Durga Prasad, a candidate of DPT.

References 

1973 births
Living people
Bhutanese MNAs 2018–2023
Druk Nyamrup Tshogpa politicians
Bhutanese women in politics
Asian Institute of Management alumni
University of the Philippines Los Baños alumni
Druk Nyamrup Tshogpa MNAs
Bhutanese people of Nepalese descent
Rai people